The CG engine is a 1.0 L, 1.3 L or 1.35 L straight-4 piston engine from Nissans Aichi Kikai division. It is an aluminum DOHC 16-valve design. The engine was developed for use in the Nissan Micra/March K11 series. All engines featured multi-point fuel injection. Redline is at 7300 rpm.

This compact, reliable, lightweight and fuel-efficient motor has also found life in many Nissan Forklift models.

The breakdown of the engine code is as follows:
 CG - Clean Green
 10, 13 or A3 - 1.0, 1.3 or 1.35 Litres
 D  - Double Overhead Cam (DOHC)
 E  - Multi-port Fuel Injection

CG10DE
The  CG10DE was built from the introduction of the Nissan Micra K11 in January 1992
 until it was replaced by the K12 series in 2002.

CG13DE

The  CG13DE was built from 1992
 and continues to power the current (2007) model K11 in Taiwan. In 2000 it was replaced by the CGA3DE in most countries.

CGA3DE
The  CGA3DE was built between November 1999 and 2002. The engine produced  @ 6000 rpm and  @ 4000 rpm. This engine, although considered a 1.4 in the European market, was still marketed as a 1.3 engine in Japan due to the cubic capacity being .
The x-alpha spec Z10 Nissan Cube was made from May 2001 to September 2002.

In October 2002 the CG engines were replaced with CR engines in Japan.

Engine reference
The CG engine was manufactured in the following versions:

See also
 Nissan Micra
 Nissan Cube
 List of Nissan engines

References

CG

Straight-four engines
Gasoline engines by model